Tell Me That You Love Me may refer to:
Tell Me That You Love Me (film), a 1983 Canadian/Israeli drama film directed by Tzipi Trope,
a song from the soundtrack album Victorious: Music from the Hit TV Show.